Allegany High School is a public high school in the Allegany County, Maryland, city of  Cumberland, United States.  Allegany High is part of Allegany County Public Schools. Allegany High School was built as Allegany County High School in 1887, hence it is often referred to as 'Alco'.

As of the 2014–2015 school year, the school had an enrollment of 671 students and 43.3 classroom teachers (on an FTE basis), for a student–teacher ratio of 15.5:1. There were 252 students (37.6% of enrollment) eligible for free lunch and 30 (4.5% of students) eligible for reduced-cost lunch. Students were 93% white, 5% African-American and 2% Asian.

History
Allegany High School was initially a secondary education school held in the Maryland Avenue Schoolhouse. The school had many different locations including the building on Greene Street, which was used as a combined middle/high school until the spring of 1926.

The old Allegany High located on  Sedgwick Street  that served the area for 93 years was demolished May 2022. Construction of the Sedgwick Street school started in 1925 with the doors opening in 1926.

In the fall of 2018 the doors of the brand new Allegany High School located at 900 Seton Drive on the site of the former Sacred Heart Hospital on Haystack Mountain were opened. The new school costed $51 million.

The “Camper” mascot is a source of much confusion. The most widely accepted theory is that Civil War General Lew Wallace and his men began calling the site "Campobello" that during their time here. The word Campobello is derived from Latin, meaning "camp of war".

Athletics

State championships
Girls Cross Country:
2A Individual 3.0 miles 1991
1A 1997, 1998
1A Individual 3.0 miles 1998, 1999, 2005, 2006, 2007
Boys Cross Country:
Class A Individual 2.5 miles 1969
Class A 1970
2A 1993
2A Individual 3.0 miles 1995, 1996
1A Individual 3.0 miles 2002, 2010
Football:
Class B 1978, 1980, 1983
2A 1988, 1989, 1991
1A 2001
1AW 2005
Girls Basketball:
Mildred Haney Murray Sportsmanship Award 1999
1A 2000
Boys Basketball:
Pre-MPSSAA 1927, 1930, 1931, 1932, 1933, 1934, 1936, 1937 
Class A 1947, 1950, 1954, 1963
Class AA 1964
Class B 1993
Jack Willard Sportsmanship Award 1993
Baseball:
2A 1989, 1990
Softball:
1A 1999, 2010

Extracurricular activities
The 'Alco White' Mock trial team is one of the many organizations in the school. In the 2005–2006 season, the team won the circuit and the regional championships, advancing to the Maryland state Mock Trial Final Four competition in April 2006. The 2006–2007 team lost in the finals to Severn School. The 2007–08 team advanced to the semi-finals, but were defeated by Severna Park. The 2008-2009 team won the Maryland State Mock Trial Championship, the program's first state title after making it to the final four in the previous three competitions.

The Allegany marching band is currently under the direction of Larry T. Jackson, and is a part of the Tournament of Bands circuit, which covers Pennsylvania, New Jersey, Maryland, Delaware, West Virginia, and Virginia. The band had a chapter championships winning streak of 17 years and has finished in the top 10 at the Atlantic Coast Championships for the past 19 seasons. The team finished in second place in 2015 (For Whom the Bell Tolls with a 97.15) and third place finalists in 2016 (Across the Divide with a 95.65).

In addition to the band programs the school sponsors indoor color guard and indoor percussion groups. The Allegany Visual Ensemble was the 2011 Winter Guard International Pittsburgh Regional Scholastic Regional A Champions.

Notable alumni
 Rod Breedlove - NFL Player 
 Earle Bruce - Former Ohio State Head Football Coach 
 Eddie Deezen – Actor  
 Jim Gaffney - NFL Player
 Frances Hughes Glendening (1969) – former First Lady of Maryland
 Aaron Laffey –  Major League Baseball pitcher 
 William H. Macy – Actor 
 Tommy Mont - American educator, university administrator, college football coach, and National Football League (NFL) player
 Mark Baker - Actor

See also 

 List of high schools in Maryland

References

External links
 Allegany High School Official site

1887 establishments in Maryland
High schools in Cumberland, MD-WV-PA
Public high schools in Maryland
Schools in Allegany County, Maryland
Educational institutions established in 1887